Pleuronichthys is a genus of fish in the family Pleuronectidae found in the Pacific Ocean.

Species
There are currently 7 recognized species in this genus:
 Pleuronichthys coenosus Girard, 1854 (C-O sole)
 Pleuronichthys cornutus (Temminck & Schlegel, 1846) (Ridge-eyed flounder) 
 Pleuronichthys decurrens D. S. Jordan & C. H. Gilbert, 1881 (Curlfin sole)
 Pleuronichthys japonicus S. Suzuki, Kawashima & Nakabo, 2009
 Pleuronichthys ocellatus Starks & W. F. Thompson, 1910 (Ocellated turbot)
 Pleuronichthys ritteri Starks & E. L. Morris, 1907 (Spotted turbot)
 Pleuronichthys verticalis D. S. Jordan & C. H. Gilbert, 1880 (Horny-head turbot)

References

 
Marine fish genera
Taxa named by Charles Frédéric Girard